Robert Barbier (born 1984) is an American college baseball coach, currently serving as head coach of the Northwestern State team. He is the son of Darren Barbier, former head coach of the Nicholls State football team. He was named the 2018 Southland Conference Coach of the Year.

Head coaching record

See also
 List of current NCAA Division I baseball coaches

References

1984 births
Living people
Archbishop Shaw High School alumni
Baseball first basemen
Northwestern State Demons baseball players
Northwestern State Demons baseball coaches
Alabama Crimson Tide baseball coaches